"A Clear and Present Danger" is the 14th episode and mid-season premiere of the third season of the NBC superhero drama series Heroes and 48th episode overall. It aired on February 2, 2009. The episode is the beginning of Volume 4: "Fugitives". It marks the first time a season of Heroes has contained more than one volume. Originally, season two was  planned to consist of three volumes, but was reduced to one volume due to the 2007–2008 Writers Guild of America strike.

Plot

Tracy Strauss is captured by armed men, while a TV interview with the new chairman of Senate Homeland Security Committee, Nathan Petrelli, plays in the background. The leader of the group (referred to as The Hunter and played by Željko Ivanek) calls to tell Nathan they have the first one.

Hiro tries to make Ando into a superhero. Ando is unimpressed as he feels his power is worthless, and leaves when Hiro injects him with a GPS implant. Later, when Hiro tracks Ando and calls him to apologize, Ando overhears Hiro being kidnapped.

Having earned her GED, Claire Bennet is looking into an elite college education with Angela Petrelli, but is more concerned with Sylar and the fact they never found his body. As Claire is leaving, she listens in on a phone call where Nathan tells Angela to keep Claire away from Matt Parkman and Peter. Angela spots Claire, who promptly leaves.

Peter is working as a paramedic and attending to a car accident victim. His partner Hesam has to pull Peter away from the casualty, with Peter insisting he could have saved him, had he been stronger. As the dead man is taken away, Hesam mentions that Peter's brother is in town for the day. Peter receives a call from Claire warning him about Nathan’s plans. Peter goes to talk to Angela while Claire goes to warn Matt. Peter catches a yellow cab, which happens to be driven by Mohinder Suresh. In a scene similar to the pilot episode of season one, Peter asks Mohinder if he ever had the feeling like he was meant to do something extraordinary. Mohinder points out that everyone is keeping a low profile, except for Nathan. They get to their destination and Mohinder lets him out.

Once Peter is gone, The Hunter gets in the cab behind him (another reference to the pilot episode), and forces Mohinder to drive to a parking garage. As Mohinder gets out of the cab, he rips off the car door, knocks out The Hunter, and uses the door as a shield. He runs away and Noah arrives in a SUV and rescues him. As they escape, Noah asks him with whom has he been in contact. They get to the exit only to discover that The Hunter and his men have cut them off. Noah apologizes and then tasers Mohinder, who staggers out of the car and collapses.

Peter arrives at Angela’s home and finds Nathan waiting for him. Nathan informs his brother that their mother is not there. He explains that he has a plan of his own and would like Peter's input. Peter expresses his disinterest and leaves. When Peter arrives at his own apartment, he finds Nathan waiting for him. Nathan apologizes for disowning him and emphasizes the importance of what he is doing, again asking Peter to join him. When Peter refuses, Noah tasers him from behind.

Sylar, alive and well, goes to see Martin Gray, the watchmaker he believed to be his father. He questions Martin and discovers that Martin purchased Sylar from his brother, who was in need of money. He gives Sylar the address, then tells him to leave, which Sylar does. When Sylar arrives at Samson Gray's home, he finds the door is open and enters. A group of armed men appear and attempt to immobilize him with tranquilizer darts. Sylar overpowers them and starts to torture one for information.

Daphne superspeeds back into her apartment where Matt is eating. They discuss using their powers to make life easier and Matt persuades her to lead a normal life while Usutu, visible only to Matt, stands nearby. Later, Usutu appears to Matt with a message, explaining  he is an illusion. Usutu says that Matt is on a journey to become a prophet and the world needs him to tell the future. Matt’s eyes turn white and he starts to sketch.

While inspecting the finished work, Claire arrives to warn him that people will be coming to get him. The drawings show Matt being shot in the neck while looking at some drawings. Suddenly, someone shoots a dart through the window into his neck. The men in black arrive and capture Claire as Matt goes down.

At an airplane hangar, Nathan reviews his prisoners, all hooded and confined to negate their powers. The Hunter arrives and reports that Sylar escaped. He also shows Nathan that one of the prisoners is Claire. Nathan takes her and puts her in a car to be driven home, telling her to forget what she has seen. While the rest of the prisoners are led onto a cargo plane, Claire escapes from the car and sneaks aboard. Once airborne, Claire finds that the prisoners include Hiro, Peter, and Mohinder, and she removes the drug feeds from the latter two. Peter manages to touch Mohinder and take his power, using it to break his shackles. As Peter attacks the guards, Claire grabs a taser and goes to the cockpit, stunning one guard and threatening the pilot. She discovers that Noah is in the copilot’s seat.

Peter tries to free Tracy as another guard attacks him. He gains Tracy’s power and inadvertently touches the side of the plane. It freezes and shatters, and the guards and at least one prisoner are swept out. As the plane starts to go down, the netting onto which Peter is holding comes unfastened and he starts to get swept away before Mohinder grabs hold of him. In the cockpit, the pilot loses control and the plane plummets towards the ground. The final shot shows Mohinder losing his grip on Peter's hand, a direct reference to the cliffhanger of the pilot episode, "Genesis".

Critical reception
Josh Modell of The A.V. Club rated this episode a B−.

Robert Canning of IGN gave the episode 7.8 out of 10.

References

External links
=

Heroes (season 3) episodes
2009 American television episodes